The Chinese American Museum (Chinese: 華美博物館; abbreviated CAM) is a museum located in Downtown Los Angeles as a part of the El Pueblo de Los Angeles Historic Monument. It is dedicated to the history and experience of Chinese Americans in the state of California, the first such museum in Southern California. It presents exhibits of fine art by Chinese American artists as well as historical exhibits.

Planning for the museum began in October 1984, with the grand opening taking place on December 18, 2003.

The museum is housed in the Garnier Building, the oldest surviving Chinese building in Southern California. The original Los Angeles Chinatown was located here before it was moved to New Chinatown for the construction of Los Angeles Union Station.

It is funded by the State of California, the City of Los Angeles, Friends of the Chinese American Museum, the Chinese Historical Society of Southern California, the Getty Foundation, the El Pueblo Association, the Center for Chinese Medicine, and hundreds of other donors.

Exhibits
A permanent exhibit at the museum is the recreation of the Hing Yuen Hong Chinese Herb Shop of yesteryear. Another permanent exhibit opened on December 13, 2012 is "Origins: The Birth and Rise of Chinese American Communities in Los Angeles", celebrating the growth and development of Cantonese American enclaves from Downtown Los Angeles to the San Gabriel Valley.

Past exhibits have included "Sunshine and Shadow: In Search of Jake Lee", showcasing the 60 watercolor work of prolific artist Jake Lee; "Milton Quon's Los Angeles" (2005-2006); "The Art of Diana Shui-In Wong" (2006); and "Tyrus Wong (Chinese: 黃齊耀): A Retrospective" (2004), who was one of the earliest and most influential Chinese American artists.
 The exhibit on "Hollywood Chinese: The Arthur Dong Collection" was opened on October 23, 2009. It was based on Arthur Dong's Hollywood Chinese documentary that was broadcast on PBS on May 27, 2009. The documentary, a study of more than 90 years of Chinese Americans in films, ranging from the first Chinese American film The Curse of Quon Gwon that was produced in 1916 to Ang Lee's 2005 Brokeback Mountain. It closed on November 7, 2010.
 "Remembering Angel Island", commemorating the centennial anniversary of the opening of the immigration station in California, July 16, 2010 – January 31, 2012. 
 Dreams Deferred: Artists Respond to Immigration, December 10, 2010 – December 18, 2011.  This exhibition showcased local artists exploring the tensions, repercussions, hopes, and dreams of immigrant communities in the face of new immigration legislation, through a broad spectrum of art including street art, graffiti art, sculptures, painting and multimedia installations. Artists included: Augustine Kofie, Cache, Eriberto Oriol, Ernesto Yerena Montejano, Eyeone, K. Lovich, Jesus Barraza of Dignidad Rebelde, Joel “rage.one” Garci, John Carlos De Luna, LeHumanBeing, Oscar Magallanes, Patrick Martinez, Sand One, Shepard Fairey, Shark Toof, O.G. Slick, Swank, and Tempt.
 Breaking Ground: Chinese American Architects in Los Angeles (1945-1980), January 19, 2012 – June 3, 2012.  Part of Pacific Standard Time: Art in L.A., 1945-1980, this exhibition showcased the achievements of four pioneering Chinese American architects whose contributions were critical to the development of Los Angeles’ urban and visual landscape between 1945 and 1980. The exhibit focused on the lives and work of Eugene Kinn Choy, Gilbert L. Leong, Helen Liu Fong, and Gin D. Wong, FAIA, four architects who played pivotal roles in the development of Mid-Century Modern and Googie Architecture movements, unique to California's Post-War architectural renaissance. 
 LA Heat: Taste Changing Condiments, March 13-July 12, 2014.  This art exhibition explored the impact of Sriracha and Tapatio in Los Angeles. The exhibit included a curated selection of artwork from artists of diverse backgrounds passionate and reflective about notions of identity, community, and foodways.  Participating artists included:  Edith Beaucage, Erik Benjamins, Audrey Chan, Ching Ching Cheng, The Chung!!, Chris Christion, Clayton Brothers, Eye One, Gajin Fujita, Daniel Gonzalez, Pato Hebert, Michael C. Hsiung, Phung Huynh, Tomo Isoyama, Nery Gabriel Lemus, Sandra Low, Trinh Mai, Patrick Martinez, Michael Massenburg, Kwanchai Moriya, Jose Ramirez, Yoshie Sakai, Jose Sarinana, Sand One, Shark Toof, Sket, Slick, Henry Taylor, Werc.

Events

Chinese New Year Celebration
During the Chinese New Year celebration each year, a Lantern Festival is held at the museum, featuring live entertainment, including lion dancers, acrobatics, musical, Chinese knotting, and dance performances. "Long Story Short", a documentary on actress Jodi Long's family, was shown at the 8th Annual festival which was held on February 7, 2009. The 2013 Lantern Festival was held Saturday, March 2, 2013, 12 p.m. – 7 p.m.

Historymakers Awards
Each year, the museum sponsors the annual Historymakers Awards Banquet, which "honors extraordinary individuals who have made a significant impact or contribution towards the advancement of the Chinese American community and beyond." A 2009 honoree was Lisa Lu (Chinese: 盧燕), Chinese-American actress and documentary producer for excellence in film and entertainment.

Notes

See also

History of the Chinese Americans in Los Angeles
Museum of Chinese in America
Chinese-American Museum of Chicago
Chinese American Museum DC
Chinese Historical Society of America
Chinese Historical Society of Southern California
Weaverville Joss House State Historic Park
Chinese Culture Center

References

External links
official Chinese American Museum website
Pauline Wong Executive Director by KCET Departures Video interview with Pauline Wong

Museums in Los Angeles
Chinese-American museums in California
Art museums and galleries in Los Angeles
Asian art museums in California
History museums in California
Buildings and structures in Downtown Los Angeles
Chinatown, Los Angeles
Downtown Los Angeles
Museums established in 2003
2000s architecture in the United States
2003 establishments in California
El Pueblo de Los Ángeles Historical Monument